Ngong Ping is a plateau in Ma On Shan, New Territories, Hong Kong. Located within Ma On Shan Country Park, it is administratively part of Sha Tin District.

History
Ngong Ping was historically the site of a village. It is still a recognized village under the New Territories Small House Policy.

At the time of the 1911 census, the population of Ngong Ping was 9. The number of males was 7.

Campsite

Ngong Ping has a camp site with 20 spots for tents for overnight camping, offering barbeques pits, benches, tables and drains as well as dry pit toilets. The campsite area is hilly surrounded by grass, rocks and low lying shrubs.

Access
Users of the campsite can reach the area by minibus from Sunshine City in Yiu On Estate or Sai Kung Town then walk from the bus terminus from Ma On Shan Village and Po Lo Che respectively.

The MacLehose Trail Section 4 and the Ma On Shan Country Trail pass through Ngong Ping. These two trails with rugged and rocky terrain are more suitable for experienced hikers.

See also
 Pyramid Hill (Hong Kong)

References

External links

 Delineation of area of existing village Ngong Ping (Sai Kung North) for election of resident representative (2019 to 2022)
 Picture of Kuet's Ancestral Hall, part of the former Ngong Ping Village

Plateaus of China
Former populated places in Hong Kong
Sha Tin District
Ma On Shan
Campsites in Hong Kong